The 1987 Federation Cup was the 25th edition of the most important competition between national teams in women's tennis.  The tournament was held at Hollyburn Country Club in Vancouver, Canada, from 26 July – 2 August.  West Germany won their first title, defeating the United States in the final. This was their first victory after four previous final appearances.

Qualifying round
All ties were played at Hollyburn Country Club in Vancouver, Canada, on hard courts.

Winning nations advance to Main Draw, losing nations play in Consolation rounds.

Israel vs. Zimbabwe

Norway vs. Peru

Denmark vs. Luxembourg

South Korea vs. Mexico

Chile vs. China

Ireland vs. Chinese Taipei

Poland vs. Philippines

Indonesia vs. Finland

Switzerland vs. Malta

Main draw

1st Round losing teams play in Consolation rounds

First round

United States vs. Japan

France vs. Austria

Great Britain vs. Chile

Belgium vs. Italy

Bulgaria vs. Greece

Ireland vs. Indonesia

Jamaica vs. Spain

Denmark vs. Australia

Argentina vs. Switzerland

Brazil vs. New Zealand

Norway vs. South Korea

Hong Kong vs. West Germany

Canada vs. Netherlands

Israel vs. Soviet Union

Poland vs. Yugoslavia

Sweden vs. Czechoslovakia

Second round

United States vs. France

Great Britain vs. Italy

Bulgaria vs. Indonesia

Spain vs. Australia

Argentina vs. New Zealand

South Korea vs. West Germany

Canada vs. Soviet Union

Yugoslavia vs. Czechoslovakia

Quarterfinals

United States vs. Great Britain

Bulgaria vs. Australia

Argentina vs. West Germany

Canada vs. Czechoslovakia

Semifinals

United States vs. Bulgaria

West Germany vs. Czechoslovakia

Final

United States vs. West Germany

Consolation rounds

Draw

First round

Mexico vs. Norway

Poland vs. Ireland

Peru vs. Malta

Hong Kong vs. Finland

Jamaica vs. Netherlands

Philippines vs. Zimbabwe

China vs. Switzerland

Israel vs. Chinese Taipei

Chile vs. Luxembourg

Second round

Sweden vs. Mexico

Denmark vs. Ireland

Brazil vs. Peru

Belgium vs. Hong Kong

Netherlands vs. Zimbabwe

Switzerland vs. Japan

Israel vs. Greece

Luxembourg vs. Austria

Quarterfinals

Sweden vs. Denmark

Brazil vs. Hong Kong

Netherlands vs. Switzerland

Israel vs. Austria

Semifinals

Sweden vs. Hong Kong

Netherlands vs. Austria

Final

Hong Kong vs. Netherlands

References

Billie Jean King Cups by year
Federation
Tennis tournaments in Canada
Sport in Vancouver
1987 in women's tennis
Tennis in British Columbia
Fed
 in Canadian women's sports